Trent Peoples (born 22 June 1998) is an Australian rugby league footballer who plays as a  forward for the South Sydney Rabbitohs in the NRL.

Background
Peoples was born in Campbelltown, New South Wales, Australia. He completed his schooling at St. Gregory's College, Campbelltown.

He played his junior rugby league with the Campbelltown Collegians.

Career
Peoples made his first grade debut for South Sydney (first grade player number 1179) in his side's 32−12 loss to the Brisbane Broncos at Stadium Australia in round 9 of the 2022 NRL season.

References

External links
Rabbitohs profile

1998 births
Living people
Australian rugby league players
Rugby league second-rows
Rugby league players from Sydney
South Sydney Rabbitohs players